Joseph R. Dorrington was an English professional football goalkeeper. He played 78 games in the Football League for Blackpool.

References

19th-century births
Year of death missing
English footballers
Association football goalkeepers
Blackburn Rovers F.C. players
Blackpool F.C. players
English Football League players